Nicolas François Dun (1764, Lunéville - 1832, Naples) was a French watercolourist and miniature painter.

References

Portrait miniaturists
French watercolourists
18th-century French painters
19th-century French painters
1764 births
1832 deaths
People from Lunéville